The 2008–09 Wichita State Shockers men's basketball team represents Wichita State University in the 2008-09 NCAA Division I men's basketball season. The team, which plays in the Missouri Valley Conference (MVC), is led by second-year head coach Gregg Marshall. The Shockers opened the season with a win over Florida A&M on November 10, 2008, and ended the season with a loss to Stanford in the College Basketball Invitational. Their final record for 2008–09 was 17–17 (8–10 MVC), a huge improvement from their 2007–08 record of 11–20 (4–14 MVC).

Regular season 
The Shockers started out with mediocre level of play, but performed well against then ranked Michigan St. and Georgetown and even beat a very good Siena team in the Old Spice Classic at the end of November. On February 21, the Shockers beat a Cleveland State team with an RPI of almost a hundred better than WSU's. Then came conference play. The Shockers lost their first 6 games in Missouri Valley play, and on January 14, were in dead last in the MVC. Then came the comeback. In the more-than-century-old MVC, 49 teams had started 0–6. None won more than five games in conference play for the rest of the season.

Post-season 
Wichita State finished MVC play 8–10 but were not rewarded well with a 7 seed in the MVC tournament. They beat Missouri St. 59–46 in the play-in game at the Scottrade Center in St. Louis, and now had to face a hot no. 2 Creighton team. It was a game no one expected them to win. The Shockers tried to keep close in the first half, but were down by 13 at halftime. Creighton came out and made a huge run in the second half, giving them a 22-point lead and a chance to embarrass Wichita State. But the Shockers did not give up, and shut Creighton down almost the rest of the way. They came within 13 with 3:43 to play in the game and 5 with about 1 minute. The Shockers were down 59–61 with about 10 seconds left, but had the ball. Toure' Murry, who had already had two game-saving shots this season, caught the inbounds pass and quickly shot a 3-pointer, which swished through the net. The Shockers had come back from 22 down to take the lead. With 9 seconds left, Creighton inbounded the ball and brought it all the way down, but shot a wild jumper that missed. A Shocker tried to grab the rebound but lost it out of bounds. Creighton had 1.8 seconds to take the lead. Booker Woodfox half-fumbled the inbounds pass, but threw up a 17-footer which swished right through. The Bluejays had escaped.

The Shockers were given a chance to bounce back from the heartbreak with a spot in the College Basketball Invitational, one of the NCAA's minor post-season tournaments made for improving teams. In the first round of the single-elimination tournament, Wichita State beat Buffalo by a score of 84–73. The Shockers season was then ended on March 23 with a 70–56 loss to Stanford in the second round of the CBI.

Schedule

References 

Wichita State
Wichita State Shockers men's basketball seasons
Wichita State
Shock
Shock